The Woman from Last Night is a 1950 West German comedy film directed by Arthur Maria Rabenalt and starring Heli Finkenzeller, Albert Matterstock, and Hilde Sessak. It was shot at the Tempelhof Studios in West Berlin. The film's sets were designed by the art director Gabriel Pellon.

Cast

References

External links

1950 comedy films
German comedy films
West German films
Films directed by Arthur Maria Rabenalt
Films shot at Tempelhof Studios
German black-and-white films
1950s German films
1950s German-language films